Ivana Rožman (born 14 July 1989 in Skopje) is a track and field sprint athlete who competes internationally for North Macedonia.

Rožman represented Macedonia at the 2008 Summer Olympics in Beijing. She competed at the 100 metres sprint and placed seventh in her heat without advancing to the second round. She ran the distance in a time of 12.92 seconds.

Competition record

References

1989 births
Living people
Macedonian female sprinters
Olympic athletes of North Macedonia
Athletes (track and field) at the 2008 Summer Olympics
Sportspeople from Skopje